Mitchell Slaggert is an American actor and model, based in New York.

He is the son of Jeff and Kellye Slaggert, and one of Douglas Leo Francis Joseph Patrick Slaggert’s 19 grandchildren. He appeared in the Broad Green feature film Wish Upon, opposite Joey King and Ryan Phillippe, and directed by John Leonetti. He also appeared in the limited series El Diablo Guardian for Blim. After being scouted on the street in Wilmington N.C., he was cast as the lead of the independent film MOSS by Daniel Peddle which premiered in the US Fiction Competition at the 2017 LA Film Festival on June 21, 2017.

As a model, Mitchell has been the face of Calvin Klein Underwear, Dsquared2, David Yurman, Jean Paul Gaultier, Versace and featured in numerous publications around the world.

Slaggert plays Jackson on Season 2 of The Sex Lives of College Girls.

References 

Living people
American male actors
Male models from New York (state)
Place of birth missing (living people)
Year of birth missing (living people)